Philps is a surname. Notable people with the surname include:

Andrew Philps (1857–1929), Canadian politician
Walter Philps (1903–?), English cricketer

See also
Philp
Phipps (surname)